Matthew Grau (born December 13, 2004), known professionally as Matt Ox, is an American rapper, singer, and songwriter from Philadelphia. He is best known for his 2017 single "Overwhelming", and for being featured on the 2018 album track "$$$" on XXXTentacion's sophomore album ? (2018).

Early life 
Ox was born in 2004. He is from Lawncrest, Philadelphia. Ox began pursuing hip hop when he was 11 years old. Since releasing music, Ox has been homeschooled.

Career 
Ox was 12 years old when he released the music video for the single "Overwhelming" in 2017 featuring instrumentals by Oogie Mane. He released singles with Warner before signing with Motown in 2018. In March 2018, he worked with rapper XXXTentacion on the song "$$$", which was featured on his sophomore album, ?. His debut album, Ox, was released October 30, 2018. It includes 11 songs less than three minutes long and has three songs featuring Chief Keef, Key!, and Valee. It was produced by Working on Dying, a Philadelphia-based production crew. 

He released his first extended play on December 13, 2020, a 10-track EP entitled Sweet 16. His second extended play UNORTHODOX was released on February 12, 2021. Both EPs featured no guest appearances from other artists. Ox's second album YEAR OF THE OX released on January 31, 2022. The album featured guest appearances from Lancey Foux and UnoTheActivist.

Artistry 
Ox's music is a blend of dark trap music, melodic rap, tread, and horrorcore. Some of his favorite artists include Soulja Boy and Lil B.

Discography

Studio albums

Extended plays

Singles

As lead artist

As featured artist

Other charted songs

References 

2004 births
American child musicians
21st-century American rappers
Rappers from Philadelphia
American male rappers
Living people
East Coast hip hop musicians
21st-century American male musicians